Debelyanov Point (‘Debelyanov Nos’ \de-be-'lya-nov 'nos\) is a point forming the northwest side of the entrance to Mitchell Cove in Robert Island, South Shetland Islands.  Situated 2.8 km northwest of Negra Point and 3.81 km southeast of Fort William Point.  Bulgarian early mapping in 2008.  Named after the Bulgarian poet Dimcho Debelyanov (1887–1916).

Maps
 L.L. Ivanov. Antarctica: Livingston Island and Greenwich, Robert, Snow and Smith Islands. Scale 1:120000 topographic map.  Troyan: Manfred Wörner Foundation, 2009.

References
 Debelyanov Point. SCAR Composite Antarctic Gazetteer
 Bulgarian Antarctic Gazetteer. Antarctic Place-names Commission. (details in Bulgarian, basic data in English)

External links
 Debelyanov Point. Copernix satellite image

Headlands of Robert Island
Bulgaria and the Antarctic